Memories of Us may refer to:

Memories of Us, 1975 album by George Jones
"Memories of Us" (song), 1975 single by George Jones

See also
"Making Memories of Us", Keith Urban song